Ive Jerolimov (born 30 March 1958 in Preko near Zadar) is a former Croatian footballer.

Club career
During his club career he played for HNK Rijeka, Hajduk Split and Cercle Brugge.

International career
He made his debut for Yugoslavia in a September 1980 World Cup qualification match against Denmark and earned a total of 6 caps, scoring no goals. He was a non-playing member of their squad at the 1982 FIFA World Cup. His final international was a November 1982 European Championship qualification match away against Bulgaria.

Career statistics

International

Club

Honours
NK Rijeka
Yugoslav Cup: 1979

Hajduk Split
Yugoslav Cup: 1984, 1987

References

External links
 
 
 hajduk.hr
 forum.b92.net
 users.skynet.be 

1958 births
Living people
People from Zadar County
Association football defenders
Association football midfielders
Yugoslav footballers
Yugoslavia international footballers
1982 FIFA World Cup players
HNK Rijeka players
HNK Hajduk Split players
Cercle Brugge K.S.V. players
Yugoslav First League players
Belgian Pro League players
Yugoslav expatriate footballers
Expatriate footballers in Belgium
Yugoslav expatriate sportspeople in Belgium